Presidential elections were held in Portugal on 11 December 1925. Following Portugal's 1911 constitution, the Congress of the Republic must elect the president in Lisbon instead of the Portuguese people.

There were a total of 7 candidates. Bernardino Machado won against his opponents and he was granted a second term as the President of Portugal.

Results

References

Portugal
1925 elections in Portugal
1925
December 1925 events